Michael Phillippi (born ) is an American artist whose work has appeared in role-playing games.

Education
Michael Phillippi started his illustration career in 1997 after graduating from the Savannah College of Art & Design.

Career
His Dungeons & Dragons work includes Libris Mortis (2004), Races of Destiny (2004), Complete Adventurer (2005), Sandstorm (2005), Lords of Madness (2005), Stormwrack (2005), Tome of Magic (2006), Complete Scoundrel (2007), Rules Compendium (2007), and Elder Evils (2007).

He is known for his work on the Magic: The Gathering collectible card game.

References

External links
 Michael Phillippi's website
 

1970s births
Living people
Place of birth missing (living people)
Role-playing game artists
Savannah College of Art and Design alumni